Chase Walker (born August 16, 1998) is an American singer, songwriter and guitarist. He is the lead vocalist of his own California based outfit, the Chase Walker Band formed in 2012, Currently Chase Walker band has been touring with various rhythm sections. Chase currently attends Belmont University in Nashville where he is pursuing a duel major of Songwriting & Music Business.

Musical career
Walker started playing blues with backtracks when he was 11. He was inspired by artists like Muddy Waters, Little Milton, Stevie Ray Vaughan and Albert Collins.

He participated in festivals, tours and clubs with his band in Vans Warped Tour, The International Blues Challenge, House of Blues, BB King’s Memphis, Ground Zero (blues club), Buddy Guy's Legends, The El Rey, The Roxy and more, opening for such as Kenny Loggins, BB King, Coco Montoya, Eric Sardinas, Tab Benoit, American Idol contestant Casey Abrams, Walter Trout, Devon Allman and Cyril Neville.

Awards and recognition
 2018 Blues Rock Review The Future of Blues Rock – 10 Acts To Watch Under 30
 2018 2nd Place in Lee Ritenour World Wide Six Strings Theory Guitar Contest
 2016 Album "Not  Quite legal" Nominated for IMA Blues Album of the Year.
 2016 Album "Not Quite legal" ranked #2 album of 2016 by Blues Rock Review.
 2016 The Voice Season 10
 2014 Lee Ritenour Six Strings Theory Guitar Finalist
 2013 & 2014 Van's Warped Tour Performer
 2013 John Lennon Songwriting Contest Winner
 Best Debut Blue in Germany – Wasser Prawda Magazine
 Song Good Day for the Blues charted #47 in the Hit-Tracks 100
 best young blues/rock band in this country - Kevin Lyman (Founder of the Van's Warped Tour)
 Member of Exclusive Brotherhood of the Guitar
 American Blues Scene Magazine – Top 10 Under 18 Artist you need to Know

Discography

Albums with band
Live at the Woodshed, 2018
Not Quite Legal, 2016
 Unleashed, 2014
 Living on Thin Ice
 Blues Deluxe
 Good Day for The Blues

Past band members
 Matt Fyke (Drums) 2012-2016
 Randon Davitt (Bass, Vocals) 2012-2016
 Peter Kastaris (Drums, Vocals) 2017
 Greggory Garner Jr (Bass) 2017
 Yates McKendree (Keyboard/Organ) 2017

References

External links
 Official website
 Chase Walker Band in Reverb Nation Channels
 
 Chase Walker Band at iTunes

1998 births
Living people
American rock musicians
Singers from Los Angeles
American blues musicians
21st-century American singers
The Voice (franchise) contestants